The Prehistoric Period is the oldest part of Cypriot history. This article covers the period 10,000 to 800 BC and ends immediately before the documented history of Cyprus begins.

Epipalaeolithic
Cyprus was not settled in the Paleolithic (before agriculture), which allowed survival of numerous dwarf animal species, such as dwarf elephants (Elephas cypriotes) and pygmy hippos (Hippopotamus minor) well into the Holocene. These animals are thought to have arrived on the island as a result of being swept out to sea while swimming off the coast of the nearby mainland. There are claims of an association of this fauna with artifacts of Epipalaeolithic foragers at Aetokremnos near Limassol on the southern coast of Cyprus. The extinction of the pygmy hippos and dwarf elephants has been linked to the earliest arrival of Homo sapiens on Cyprus. There is evidence of this because of the piles of burned bones in the camps occupied by these early humans in caves on the southernmost point on the Island.

Neolithic

Aceramic Neolithic
The oldest evidence of neolithic settlement is dated to 8800–8600 BC. The first settlers were already agriculturalists (PPNB), but did not yet produce pottery (aceramic Neolithic). They introduced the dog, sheep, goats and maybe cattle and pigs as well as numerous wild animals like foxes (Vulpes vulpes) and Persian fallow deer (Dama mesopotamica) that were previously unknown on the island. The PPNB settlers built round houses with floors made of terrazzo of burned lime (e.g. Kastros, Shillourokambos, Tenta) and cultivated einkorn and emmer. Pig, sheep, goat and cattle were kept, but remained morphologically wild. Evidence for cattle (attested at Shillourokambos) is rare and when they apparently died out in the course of the 8th millennium they were not reintroduced until the early Bronze Age.

In the 6th millennium BC, the aceramic Choirokoitia culture (Neolithic I) was characterized by round houses (tholoi), stone vessels and an economy based on sheep, goats and pigs. The daily life of the people in those Neolithic villages was spent in farming, hunting, animal husbandry and the lithic industry, while homesteaders (likely women) were engaged in spindling and weaving cloths, in addition to their probable participation in other activities. The lithic industry was the most individual feature of this aceramic culture and innumerable stone vessels made of grey andesite have been discovered during excavations. The houses had a foundation of river pebbles, the remainder of the building was constructed in mudbrick. Sometimes several round houses were joined together to form a kind of compound. Some of these houses reach a diameter of up to 10 m. Inhumation burials are located inside the houses.

Water wells discovered by archaeologists in western Cyprus are believed to be among the oldest in the world, dated at 9,000 to 10,500 years old, putting them in the Stone Age. They are said to show the sophistication of early settlers, and their heightened appreciation for the environment.

Plant remains indicate the cultivation of cereals, lentils, beans, peas and a kind of plum called Bullace. Remains of the following animal species were recovered during excavations: Persian fallow deer, goat, sheep, mouflon and pig. More remains indicate Red deer, Roe deer, a kind of horse and a kind of dog but no cattle as yet.

Life expectancy seems to have been short; the average age at death appears to have been about 34 years, and there was a high infant mortality rate.

In 2004, the remains of an 8-month-old cat were discovered buried with its human owner at a Neolithic archeological site in Cyprus. The grave is estimated to be 9,500 years old, predating Egyptian civilization and pushing back the earliest known feline-human association significantly.

Ceramic Neolithic

The aceramic civilisation of Cyprus came to an end quite abruptly around 6000 BC. It was probably followed by a vacuum of almost 1,500 years until around 4500 BC when one sees the emergence of Neolithic II (Ceramic Neolithic).

At this time newcomers arrived in Cyprus introducing a new Neolithic era. The main settlement that embodies most of the characteristics of the period is Sotira near the south coast of Cyprus. The following ceramic Sotira phase (Neolithic II) has monochrome vessels with combed decoration. It had nearly fifty houses, usually having a single room that had its own hearth, benches, platforms and partitions that provided working places. The houses were on the main free-standing, with relatively thin walls and tended to be square with rounded corners. The sub-rectangular houses had two or three rooms. In Khirokitia, the remains of the Sotira phase overlay the aceramic remains. There are Sotira-ceramics in the earliest levels of Erimi as well. In the North of the island, the ceramic levels of Troulli may be synchronous with Sotira in the South.

The Late Neolithic is characterised by a red-on white ware. The late Neolithic settlement of Kalavassos-Pamboules has sunken houses.

Chalcolithic

The Neolithic culture was destroyed by an earthquake c. 3800 BC. In the society that emerged there are no overt signs of newcomers but signs of continuity, therefore despite the violent natural catastrophe, there is an internal evolution that is formalised around 3500 BC with appearance of the first metalwork and the beginning of the Chalcolithic (copper and stone) period that lasted until about 2500/2300 BC. Very few chisels, hooks and jewellery of pure copper have survived, but in one example there is a minimal presence of tin, something which may support contact with Asia Minor, where copper-working was established earlier.

During the Chalcolithic period changes of major importance took place along with technological and artistic achievements, especially towards its end. The presence of a stamp seal and the size of the houses that was not uniform, both hint at property rights and social hierarchy. The same story is supported by the burials because some of them were deposited in pits without grave goods and some in shaft graves with relatively rich furniture, both being indications of wealth accumulation by certain families and social differentiation.

The Eneolithic or Chalcolithic period is divided into the Erimi (Chalcolithic I) and Ambelikou/Ayios Georghios (Chalcolithic II) phases.
The type site of the Neolithic I period is Erimi on the South coast of the island. The ceramic is characterised by red-on white pottery with linear and floral designs. Stone (steatite) and clay figurines with spread arms are common. In Erimi, a copper chisel has been found, this is the oldest copper find in Cyprus so far. Otherwise, copper is still rare. Another important Chalcolithic site is Lempa (Lemba).

The Chalcolithic period did not come to an end at the same time throughout Cyprus, and lingered in the Paphos area until the arrival of the Bronze Age.

Bronze Age

Early Bronze Age
The new era was introduced by people from Anatolia who came to Cyprus about 2400 BC. The newcomers are identified archaeologically because of a distinct material culture, known as the Philia Culture. This was the earliest manifestation of the Bronze Age. Philia sites are found in most parts of the island.

As the newcomers knew how to work with copper they soon moved to the so-called copperbelt of the island, that is the foothills of the Troodos mountains. This movement reflects the increased interest in the raw material that was going to be so closely connected with Cyprus for several centuries afterwards.

The Philia phase of the Bronze Age (or Philia phases) saw a rapid transformation of technology and economy. Rectilinear buildings made of mud-brick, the plough, the warp-weighted loom and clay pot stands are among the characteristic introductions. Cattle were reintroduced, together with the donkey.

The succeeding Early Bronze Age is divided into three general phases (Early Cypriot I - III) - a continuous process of development and population increase. Marki Alonia is the best excavated settlement of this period.

Marki Alonia and Sotira Kaminoudhia are excavated settlements. Many cemeteries are known, the most important of which is Bellapais Vounous on the North coast.

Middle Bronze Age

The Middle Bronze Age, which follows the Early Bronze Age (1900–1600 BC), is a relatively short period and its earlier part is marked by peaceful development.
The Middle Bronze Age is known from several excavated settlements: Marki Alonia, Alambra Mouttes and Pyrgos Mavroraki.  These give evidence of economy and architecture of the period.
From Alambra and Marki in central Cyprus we know that the houses were rectangular with many rooms, with lanes allowing people to move freely in the community. At the end of the Middle Bronze Age, fortresses were built in various places, a clear indication of unrest, although the cause is uncertain.
The most important cemeteries are at Bellapais, Lapithos, Kalavasos and Deneia. An extensive collection of Bronze Age pottery can be seen online from the cemeteries at Deneia.

The up to now oldest copper workshops have been excavated at Pyrgos-Mavroraki, 90 km southwest of Nicosia.  Cyprus was known as Alashiya, the name is preserved in Egyptian, Hittite, Assyrian and Ugaritic documents.  The first recorded name of a Cypriot king is Kushmeshusha, as appears on letters sent to Ugarit in the 13th century BC.

Late Bronze Age
The beginning of the Late Bronze Age does not differ from the closing years of the previous period. Unrest, tension and anxiety mark all these years, probably because of some sort of engagement with the Hyksos, who ruled Egypt at this time but were expelled from there in the mid-1500s BC. Soon afterwards peaceful conditions prevailed in the Eastern Mediterranean that witnessed a flowering of trade relations and the growing of urban centres. Chief among them was Enkomi, near modern Famagusta, though several other harbour towns also sprang up along the southern coast of Cyprus. Around 1500 BC, Thutmose III claimed Cyprus and imposed a tax on the island.

Literacy was introduced to Cyprus with the Cypro-Minoan syllabary, a derivation from Cretan Linear A. It was first used in early phases of the late Bronze Age (LCIB, 14th century BC) and continued in use for c. 400 years into the LC IIIB, maybe up to the second half of the 11th century BC. It likely evolved into the Cypriot syllabary.

The Late Cypriot (LC) IIC (1300–1200 BC) was a time of local prosperity. Cities were rebuilt on a rectangular grid plan, like Enkomi, where the town gates now correspond to the grid axes and numerous grand buildings front the street system or newly founded. Great official buildings (constructed from ashlar-masonry) point to increased social hierarchisation and control. Some of these buildings contain facilities for processing and storing olive oil, like at Maroni-Vournes and "building X" at Kalavassos-Ayios Dhimitrios. Other ashlar-buildings are known from Palaeokastro. A Sanctuary with a horned altar constructed from ashlar-masonry has been found at Myrtou-Pigadhes, other temples have been located at Enkomi, Kition and Kouklia (Palaepaphos). Both the regular layout of the cities and the new masonry techniques find their closest parallels in Syria, especially in Ugarit (modern Ras Shamra).

Rectangular corbelled tombs point to close contacts with Syria and Palestine as well. The practice of writing spread, and tablets in the Cypro-Minoan script have been found on the mainland as well (Ras Shamra). Ugaritic texts from Ras Shamra and Enkomi mention "Ya", the Assyrian name of Cyprus, that thus seems to have been in use already in the late Bronze Age.

Cyprus was, at some times, a part of the Hittite empire but was a client state and as such was not invaded but rather merely part of the empire by association and governed by the ruling kings of Ugarit. As such Cyprus was essentially "left alone with little intervention in Cypriot affairs". However, during the reign of Tudhaliya IV the island was briefly invaded by the Hittites for either reasons of securing the copper resource or as a way of preventing piracy. Shortly afterwards the island had to be reconquered again by his son Suppiluliuma II, around 1200 BC. Some towns (Enkomi, Kition, Palaeokastro and Sinda) show traces of destruction at the end of LC IIC. Originally, two waves of destruction, c. 1230 BC by the Sea Peoples and 1190 BC by Aegean refugees, or 1190 and 1179 BC according to Paul Aström had been proposed. Some smaller settlements (Ayios Dhimitrios and Kokkinokremnos) were abandoned but do not show traces of destruction.

The years of peace that brought about such a flowering of culture and civilisation did not last. During these years Cyprus reached unprecedented heights in prosperity and it played a rather neutral role in the differences of her powerful neighbours.

Rich finds from this period testify to a vivid commerce with other countries. We have jewellery and other precious objects from the Aegean along with pottery that prove the close connections of the two areas, though finds coming from Near Eastern countries are also plentiful.

In the later phase of the late Bronze Age (LCIIIA, 1200–1100 BC) great amounts of "Mycenaean" IIIC:1b pottery were produced locally. New architectural features include Cyclopean walls, found on the Greek mainland as well and a certain type of rectangular stepped capitals, endemic on Cyprus. Chamber tombs are given up in favour of shaft graves.
Cyprus was settled by Mycenaean Greeks by the end of the Bronze Age, beginning the Hellenization of the island. Large amounts of IIIC:1b pottery are found in Palestine during this period as well. There are finds that show close connections to Egypt as well. In Hala Sultan Tekke Egyptian pottery has been found, among them wine jugs bearing the cartouche of Seti I and fish bones of the Nile perch.

Another Greek wave of colonization is believed to have taken place in the following century (LCIIIB, 1100–1050), indicated, among other things, by a new type of graves (long dromoi) and Mycenean influences in pottery decoration.

Most authors claim that the Cypriot city kingdoms, first described in written sources in the 8th century BC were already founded in the 11th century BC. Other scholars see a slow process of increasing social complexity between the 12th and the 8th centuries, based on a network of chiefdoms. In the 8th century (geometric period) the number of settlements increases sharply and monumental tombs, like the 'Royal' tombs of Salamis appear for the first time. This could be a better indication for the appearance of the Cypriot kingdoms. This period shows the appearance of large urban centers.

Iron Age
The Iron Age follows the Submycenean period (1125–1050 BC) or Late Bronze Age and is divided into the:
 Geometric 1050–700 BC
 Archaic 700–525 BC

In the ensuing Early Iron Age Cyprus becomes predominantly Greek. Pottery shapes and decoration show a marked Aegean inspiration although Oriental ideas creep in from time to time. Pottery types also appear from other Mediterranean cultures as evidenced from in archaeological recovery on Cyprus of pottery from Cydonia, a powerful urban center of ancient Crete.
New burial customs with rock-cut chamber tombs having a long "dromos" (a ramp leading gradually towards the entrance) along with new religious beliefs speak in favour of the arrival of people from the Aegean. The same view is supported by the introduction of the safety pin that denotes a new fashion in dressing and also by a name scratched on a bronze skewer from Paphos and dating between 1050–950 BC.

Foundations myths documented by classical authors connect the foundation of numerous Cypriot towns with immigrant Greek heroes in the wake of the Trojan war. For example, Teucer, the brother of Aias was supposed to have founded Salamis, and the Arcadian Agapenor of Tegea to have replaced the native ruler Kinyras and to have founded Paphos. Some scholars see this a memory of a Greek colonisation already in the 11th century. In the 11th-century tomb 49 from Palaepaphos-Skales three bronze obeloi with inscriptions in Cypriot syllabic script have been found, one of which bears the name of Opheltas. This is the first indication of Greek language use on the island, although it is written in the Cypriot syllabary that remained in use down to the 3rd century BC.

Cremation as a burial rite is seen as a Greek introduction as well. The first cremation burial in Bronze vessels has been found at Kourion-Kaloriziki, tomb 40, dated to the first half of the 11th century (LCIIIB). The shaft grave contained two bronze rod tripod stands, the remains of a shield, and a golden sceptre as well. Formerly seen as the Royal grave of first Argive founders of Kourion, it is now interpreted as the tomb of a native Cypriote or a Phoenician prince. The cloisonné enamelling of the sceptre head with the two falcons surmounting it has no parallels in the Aegean, but shows a strong Egyptian influence.

In the 8th century, numerous Phoenician colonies were founded, like Kart-Hadasht ('New Town'), present day Larnaca and Salamis. The oldest cemetery of Salamis has indeed produced children's burials in Canaanite jars, clear indication of Phoenician presence already in the LCIIIB (11th century). Similar jar burials have been found in cemeteries in Kourion-Kaloriziki and Palaepaphos-Skales near Kouklia. In Skales, many Levantine imports and Cypriote imitations of Levantine forms have been found and point to a Phoenician expansion even before the end of the 11th century.

The 8th century BC saw a marked increase of wealth in Cyprus. Communications to the east and west were on the ascent and this created a prosperous society. Testifying to this wealth are the so-called royal tombs of Salamis, which, although plundered, produced a truly royal abundance of wealth. Sacrifices of horses, bronze tripods and huge cauldrons decorated with sirens, griffins etc., chariots with all their ornamentation and the horses' gear, ivory beds and thrones exquisitely decorated were all deposited into the tombs' "dromoi" for the sake of their masters.

The late 8th century is the time of the spreading of the Homeric poems, the "Iliad" and the "Odyssey". Funerary customs at Salamis and elsewhere were greatly influenced by these poems. The deceased were given skewers and firelogs in order to roast their meat, a practice found in contemporary Argos and Crete, recalling the similar gear of Achilles when he entertained other Greek heroes in his tent. Honey and oil, described by Homer as offerings to the dead are also found at Salamis, and the flames of fire that consumed the deceased were quenched with wine as it happened to Patroclus' body after it was given to the flames. The hero's ashes were gathered carefully wrapped into a linen cloth and put into a golden urn.

At Salamis the ashes of the deceased are also wrapped into a cloth and deposited into a bronze cauldron. Therefore, the Cypriots along with their extravagant display of wealth that bears many oriental features, do not forget their roots for which they must have been very proud. The circulation of the Homeric poems must have revived the interest in their ancestors whose system of government they never lost sight of.

The Prehistoric Period came to an end with the writing of the first works that still survive, first by the Assyrians, then by Greeks and Romans.

Genetic studies

Neolithic Cyprus 
In their archaeogenetics study, Lazaridis et al. (2022) carried out principal components analysis (PCA), projecting the ancient individuals onto the variation of present-day West Eurasians. They discovered that Neolithic Cypriots genetically clustered with Neolithic Anatolians. Two main clusters emerge: an “Eastern Mediterranean” Anatolian/Levantine cluster that also includes the geographically intermediate individuals from Cyprus, and an “inland” Zagros-Caucasus-Mesopotamia-Armenia-Azerbaijan cluster. There is structure within these groupings. Anatolian individuals group with each other and with those from Cyprus, whereas Levantine individuals are distinct.

During the Neolithic era the highest proportion of Anatolian Neolithic-related ancestry is observed in Neolithic Anatolian populations as well as Neolithic Aegeans and the early farmers of Cyprus. The high Anatolian-related ancestry in Cyprus revealed by their model and subsequent analyses sheds light on debates about the origins of the people who spread Pre-Pottery Neolithic culture to Cyprus. Parallels in subsistence, technology, settlement organization, and ideological indicators suggest close contacts between Pre-Pottery Neolithic B people in Cyprus and on the mainland, but the geographic source of the Cypriot Pre-Pottery Neolithic populations has been unclear, with many possible points of origin. An inland Middle Euphrates source has been suggested on the basis of architectural and artifactual similarities. However, the faunal record at Cypriot Pre-Pottery Neolithic B sites and the use of Anatolian obsidian as raw material suggest linkages with Central and Southern Anatolia, and the genetic data increase the weight of evidence in favor of this scenario of a primary source in Anatolia.

See also
Cyprus dwarf hippopotamus
Cyprus dwarf elephant

References

Bibliography
 Bernard Knapp, A. Prehistoric and Protohistoric Cyprus. Oxford University Press, 2008.
 Clarke, Joanne, with contributions by Carole McCartney and Alexander Wasse. On the Margins of Southwest Asia: Cyprus during the 6th to 4th Millennia BC.
 Gitin S., A. Mazar, E. Stern (eds.), Mediterranean Peoples in Transition, Thirteenth to Early Tenth Centuries BCE (Jerusalem, Israel exploration Society 1998). Late Bronze Age and transition to the Iron Age. 
 Muhly J. D. The role of the Sea People in Cyprus during the LCIII period. In: V. Karageorghis/J. D. Muhly (eds), Cyprus at the close of the Bronze Age (Nicosia 1984), 39–55. End of Bronze Age
 
 Swiny, Stuart (2001) Earliest Prehistory of Cyprus, American School of Oriental Research 
 Tatton-Brown, Veronica. Cyprus BC, 7000 Years of History (London, British Museum 1979).
 Webb J. M. and D. Frankel, Characterising the Philia facies. Material culture, chronology and the origins of the Bronze Age in Cyprus. American Journal of Archaeology 103, 1999, 3-43.

External links
 
 Archaeology and history of Cyprus
 Deneia Bronze Age pottery 
 Ancient History of Cyprus, by Cypriot government .

 
Cyprus
Cyprus
Cyprus
Cyprus
Cyprus